Empress Xiaodexian (12 April 1831 – 24 January 1850), of the Manchu Bordered Yellow Banner Sakda clan, was a consort of the Xianfeng Emperor.

Life

Family background
Empress Xiaodexian's personal name was not recorded in history. Her family originally belonged to the Bordered Blue Banner.

 Father: Futai, served as a fourth rank literary official in the Court of Imperial Sacrifices, and held the title of a duke
 Paternal grandfather: Qichang
 Paternal grandmother: Lady Nara
 Mother: Lady Aisin Gioro
 Maternal grandfather: Ulgungga (1778–1846), held the title Prince Zheng of the First Rank from 1794–1846, Jirgalang's great great great great grandson
 Maternal uncle: Duanhua (1807–1861), held the title Prince Zheng of the First Rank from 1846–1861, the maternal grandfather of Empress Xiaozheyi (1854–1875)
 One sister
 One younger brother

Daoguang era
The future Empress Xiaodexian was born on the first day of the third lunar month in the 11th year of the reign of the Daoguang Emperor, which translates to 12 April 1831 in the Gregorian calendar.

In 1847, Lady Sakda married Yizhu, the fourth son of the Daoguang Emperor, and became Yizhu's primary consort. She died in January 1850.

Xianfeng era
About a month after her death, the Daoguang Emperor died and was succeeded by Yizhu, who became the Xianfeng Emperor. As the Xianfeng Emperor's primary consort, Lady Sakda was posthumously honoured as Empress, and was interred in the Ding Mausoleum of the Eastern Qing tombs.

Titles
 During the reign of the Daoguang Emperor (r. 1820–1850):
 Lady Sakda (from 12 April 1831)
 Primary consort (from 31 March 1848)
 During the reign of the Xianfeng Emperor (r. 1850–1861):
 Empress Xiaode (from 30 November 1850)
 During the reign of the Tongzhi Emperor (r. 1861–1875):
 Empress Xiaodexian (from December 1861 or January 1862)

See also
 Ranks of imperial consorts in China#Qing
 Royal and noble ranks of the Qing dynasty

Notes

References
 
 
 

1831 births
1850 deaths
Qing dynasty posthumous empresses
Manchu nobility
19th-century Chinese women
19th-century Chinese people